Shortridge is a surname. Notable people with the name include 

Clara Shortridge Foltz (1849–1934), American lawyer
Belle Hunt Shortridge (1858–1893), American author
Eli C. D. Shortridge (1830–1908), American politician, Governor of North Dakota
Guy C. Shortridge (1880–1949), South African mammalogist and curator
Jennie Shortridge (born 1959), American novelist and musician
Pat Shortridge, American lobbyist
Samuel M. Shortridge (1861–1952), American politician from California
Stephen Shortridge (born 1951), American actor

See also 

Shortridge Academy, residential secondary school in Milton, New Hampshire, United States
Shortridge High School, public high school located in Indianapolis, Indiana, United States
Shortridge–Meridian Street Apartments Historic District, national historic district located at Indianapolis, Indiana, United States